Kennelia tropica is a moth of the family Tortricidae which is endemic to Vietnam.

The ground colour of the forewings is whitish hardly mixed with brownish grey and sparsely sprinkled with brownish. The hindwings are brownish white.

Etymology
The name refers to the tropical area of the Oriental Region.

References

External links

Moths described in 2009
Endemic fauna of Vietnam
Moths of Asia
Eucosmini
Taxa named by Józef Razowski